Starring Rosi is the fifth and technically final album released by Ash Ra Tempel, as it is the last to feature Manuel Göttsching. It was recorded at Studio Dierks, Stommeln by Dieter Dierks. It was originally released on LP by Ohr under their 'Kosmische Musik' imprint, catalogue number KM 58.007.

Generally regarded as something of a turning point for Göttsching, this album to some extent dispenses with the lengthy jams of previous albums and adopts a tighter song-structure. The line-up is a reduced one following the departure of Harmut Enke; Göttsching plays most of the instruments, with Wallenstein's Harald Großkopf guesting on drums.

Track listing
SIDE A: 
"Laughter Loving" (Göttsching) – 8:00
"Day-Dream" (Göttsching, Müller) – 5:21
"Schizo" (Göttsching) – 2:47
"Cosmic Tango" (Göttsching, Müller) – 2:06
SIDE B: 
"Interplay of Forces" (Göttsching, Müller) – 8:58
"The Fairy Dance" (Göttsching) – 3:07
"Bring Me Up" (Göttsching, Müller) – 4:33

Personnel
Manuel Göttsching – guitar, vocals, acoustic guitars, bass, electric piano, mellotron, synthesiser, congas
Rosemarie Müller – voice and vocals, vibes, concert harp, lyrics (credited as 'Rosi')

Additional personnel
Harald Großkopf – drums
Dieter Dierks - bass on "Bring Me Up", chorus arrangement on "Day-Dream", engineer
Heiner Friesz - assistant engineer

References

Starring Rosi
1973 albums